Marianelli is an Italian surname. Notable people with the surname include:

Alessandra Marianelli (born 1986), Italian opera singer
Dario Marianelli (born 1963), Italian composer

Italian-language surnames